Aharon Yehuda Leib Shteinman, also Shtainman or Steinman (November 3, 1914 – December 12, 2017), was a Haredi rabbi in Bnei Brak, Israel. Following the death of Yosef Shalom Elyashiv in 2012, he was widely regarded as the Gadol HaDor (Leader of the Generation), the leader of the non-Hasidic Lithuanian Haredi Jewish world. Along with several other rabbis, Shteinman is credited with reviving and expanding the appeal of European-style yeshivas in Israel.

Early life
Aharon Yehuda Leib Shteiman was born in Kamyenyets (Kaminetz), the son of Noach Tzvi and Gittel Faiga, and raised in Brest (Brisk), then part of the Russian Empire. He studied in Yeshivas Toras Chessed in Brest, headed by  a rabbi known as the Imrei Moshe. He attended shiurim (Torah lectures) given by Yitzchok Zev Soloveitchik (the Brisker Rav). He also studied in Kletzk under Aharon Kotler.

Upon reaching draft age in 1937, Shteinman was subject to the Polish draft, as Brest had come under the control of the newly established Polish state in the aftermath of the First World War. He and his close friend, Moshe Soloveitchik (a grandson of Chaim Soloveitchik), tried to evade the draft by starving themselves, but they were declared fit to serve by the draft officer. The two then fled with other Brisk students to Montreux, Switzerland, where they returned to Torah study in Yeshivas Etz Chaim. With the outbreak of World War II, the two became war refugees, and were incarcerated in the Schonenberg labor camp near Basel, where nearly all the inmates were Torah-observant. Shteinman and his friend were put to work laying roads, but due to his thin frame and short stature, he was released from manual labor and assigned to a desk job. Shteinman was the only member of his family to survive the war.
 
Shteinman was known for his extremely modest lifestyle. His apartment, on Chazon Ish Street 5, was sparsely furnished, and had not been painted in many years. Until 2014, he slept on the same thin mattress that he had received from the Jewish Agency upon his arrival in Israel in the early 1950s.

Rabbinic career
During his first years in Israel, Shteinman and his family lived in Kfar Saba; his sons were sent to a cheder in Petah Tikva. Eventually, they relocated to Bnei Brak, where he headed the Ponevezh Kollel. In 1955, the Ponevezher Rav, Yosef Shlomo Kahaneman, opened the yeshivah ketanah of Ponevezh, called Ponevezh L'Tzi'irim, and asked Shteinman to serve as rosh yeshiva (dean), together with Michel Yehuda Lefkowitz. Shteinman stopped giving his regular shiur in 1998, but retained the title of rosh yeshiva. He was also rosh yeshiva of Yeshivas Gaon Yaakov, which is led by his son-in-law, Zev Berlin.

Despite publicly supporting life-long Torah study and forbidding secular learning, Shteinman's private positions were perceived as more nuanced and accommodating. This made him a target of criticism from both right-wing elements of the Haredi world, as well as reformists. One such false perception was that he supported the idea of weak yeshiva students being drafted to the Netzah Yehuda Battalion, a religious section of the Israel Defense Forces. Don Segal inquired about this rumor in a letter to Shteinman, to which he responded  In a related development, the rosh yeshiva of Derech HaTorah brought a bachur (yeshiva student) in to see Shteinman. The student said he had no taste at all for learning, and that he had been unsuccessful in yeshiva, and therefore he wanted to go to the army. Shteinman told the student that it is forbidden to go to the army because they ruin people. The bachur retorted, "But today they have a program in the army where you can keep Torah and mitzvos." Shteinman responded, "There is no such thing. People who go to the army always get ruined." When the bachur tried to argue with him a bit, Shteinman responded forcefully, banged on his table and said, "I guarantee you that if you go to the army, regardless of what program you join, you will return a total non Jew.' Recoiling at this, the student gave up his plans and returned to yeshiva.

Political career

When Elazar Shach, the founder of the Haredi Degel HaTorah political party, would be consulted for advice, he would sometimes refer people to Shteinman. Shteinman was a leader of Degel HaTorah, and exerted much political power in the United Torah Judaism political coalition. He was close with Yaakov Aryeh Alter (the Gerrer Rebbe), a major supporter of Agudat Yisrael.

Shteinman told the Degel HaTorah Knesset members that their main purpose for participating in the Knesset was to protect the status of yeshiva bochurim from being drafted into the army, and that not a single bochur should be conscripted. 

In March 2014, Shteinman organized a mass protest against Yair Lapid's drafting of a law that would force all Torah students to enlist except for 1,800 "exceptional" students. Shteinman was found by his grandchildren to be crying and reciting Tehillim (Psalms) to annul the decree. Although the draft law passed, it was eventually annulled when the government coalition dissolved a few months later.

Travels abroad
When he was in his nineties, Shteinman undertook to visit and strengthen key Haredi and other religious Jewish communities outside of Israel. In 2005, he visited a number of cities in North America with significant Haredi populations or institutions, including Brooklyn, Lakewood, New York City, and Passaic. He met with many American Haredi rabbis, including Aharon Schechter of Yeshiva Rabbi Chaim Berlin. In 2006, He traveled to the Jewish community of Los Angeles on Lag Ba'omer, where over 5,000 individuals attended the gathering. He planned to travel together with Yaakov Aryeh Alter (the Gerrer Rebbe) to Montreal in May 2006, but they delayed their trip to avoid protests from the Neturei Karta. After visiting Montreal, the rabbis parted ways. The Gerrer Rebbe continued to New York, and then returned to Jerusalem, while Shteinman went on to visit the Jewish communities in several South American cities, including Mexico City and Buenos Aires.

In May 2007, Shteinman visited France, followed by England, where he addressed large gatherings in Manchester and Gateshead. In June 2010, Shteinman visited the Jewish communities of Odessa, Berlin, and Gibraltar. In 2012, he traveled to Paris to deliver talks to the French Jewish community.

Personal life
While still in Switzerland, Shteinman married Tamar (Tema) Kornfeld (d. 2002), the daughter of Shammai Shraga Kornfeld of Antwerp. She had been sent to Switzerland from Poland to cure her respiratory problems, and had also become a refugee when World War II broke out. The couple had four children.

Death
In December 2016, Shteinman was hospitalized with pneumonia at Mayanei Hayeshua Medical Center in Bnei Brak. He eventually recovered, but doctors said at the time that they were "very concerned", and that a "general decline" in his physical condition has begun. In January 2017, at 102 years of age, Shteinman was again hospitalized. The Jerusalem Post reported that he was suffering from shortness of breath and an infection-related fever. He was released after two weeks in intensive care. He was again hospitalized in October 2017 for fever and weakness, and was released after several days in intensive care. Two weeks later, while he was at the hospital for testing, there was an unexpected deterioration of his health. Shteinman died on 12 December 2017, aged 103. His funeral was attended by an estimated 200,000 Jews.

Published works
Shteinman was the author of a popular series of kuntresim (pamphlets) on Torah subjects such as emunah (faith), chinuch (education), and hashgacha (Divine providence). The pamphlets are based on shiurim that he began giving to Ponevezh Kollel students in his home in 1994, and on shmuessen (ethical talks) that he began giving to students in Yeshivas Gaon Yaakov in 1978. Ranging in size from 24 to 100 pages, the pamphlets quickly sold out. An English-language translation of many of these subjects was published in 2013 by Israel Book Shop under the title Leading with Love: Guidance for Our Generation from Maran HaRav Aharon Yehudah Leib Shteinman shlit"a on Torah, Emunah, Chinuch, the Home, and More.

Shteinman originally published his main works on the Talmud anonymously under the name Ayelet HaShachar (alluding to his initials and those of his wife, Tamar [AYeLeT = Aharon Yehuda Leib Tamar], in Hebrew, as well as the "morning star" of Psalms 22).

Ayeles HaShachar al HaTorah (on the Pentateuch)
Breishis
Shmos
Vayikra
Bamidbar
Devarim

Ayeles HaShachar on Shas (Talmud)
Bava Metziah
Bava Kama
Gittin
Yevamos
Makkos and Shevuos
Nedarim
Kiddushin
Zevachim 1 2 3

Chessed Umishpat on Maseches Sanhedrin 

Yimaleh Pi Tehilasecha 1  2  - Mussar shmusen (ethical talks)

Mipekudecha Esbonan - Talks on Yomim Noraim (days of awe)

References

Further reading
The Rosh Yeshiva by Shai Pe'er – Mishpacha Magazine – 13 Kislev 5766 12.14.05 – pgs. 28–33

External links

Rabbi Aharon Shteinman, The Gerrer Rebbe, and Rav Usher Weiss visit Los Angeles at Google Videos

Shiurim from Rabbi Shteinman on various topics

1914 births
2017 deaths
Haredi rabbis in Israel
Belarusian Haredi rabbis
Rosh yeshivas
Ponevezh Yeshiva
People from Bnei Brak
Haredi rabbis in Mandatory Palestine
Israeli centenarians
Israeli people of Belarusian-Jewish descent
Exponents of Jewish law
Rabbis from Brest, Belarus
Authors of books on Jewish law
Rabbis in Bnei Brak
Men centenarians